Albert Hopoate may refer to:
 Albert Hopoate (rugby league, born 1985), Australian rugby league player
 Albert Hopoate (rugby league, born 2001), Australian rugby league player